Yonder Eduardo Godoy (born 19 April 1993) is a Venezuelan racing cyclist, who rides for Venezuelan amateur team Indet Trujillo. He rode in the 2014 Giro d'Italia.

Major results
Source: 

2013
 National Under-23 Road Championships
1st  Road race
1st  Time trial
 3rd  Time trial, Bolivarian Games
 10th Overall Okolo Slovenska
2014
 1st  Time trial, National Under-23 Road Championships
 4th Time trial, South American Games
 8th Overall Vuelta a Venezuela
1st Young rider classification
 9th Overall Volta de Ciclismo Internacional do Estado de São Paulo
2015
 1st  Time trial, National Road Championships
 10th Time trial, Pan American Games
2016
 2nd Overall Tour of Taihu Lake
 6th Coppa Ugo Agostoni
2017
 6th Overall Tour of Turkey
2022
 10th Overall Clásico RCN

Grand Tour general classification results timeline

References

External links

1993 births
Living people
Venezuelan male cyclists
Place of birth missing (living people)
Cyclists at the 2015 Pan American Games
Pan American Games competitors for Venezuela
20th-century Venezuelan people
21st-century Venezuelan people